In combinatorics, the addition principle or rule of sum is a basic counting principle.  Stated simply, it is the intuitive idea that if we have A number of ways of doing something and B number of ways of doing another thing and we can not do both at the same time, then there are  ways to choose one of the actions. In mathematical terms, the addition principle states that, for disjoint sets A and B, we have .

The rule of sum is a fact about set theory. 

The addition principle can be extended to several sets. If  are pairwise disjoint sets, then we have:This statement can be proven from the addition principle by induction on n.

Simple example 
A person has decided to shop at one store today, either in the north part of town or the south part of town. If they visit the north part of town, they will shop at either a mall, a furniture store, or a jewelry store (3 ways). If they visit the south part of town then they will shop at either a clothing store or a shoe store (2 ways).

Thus there are  possible shops the person could end up shopping at today.

Inclusion–exclusion principle 

The inclusion–exclusion principle (also known as the sieve principle) can be thought of as a generalization of the rule of sum in that it too enumerates the number of elements in the union of some sets (but does not require the sets to be disjoint). It states that if A1, ..., An are finite sets, then

Subtraction principle 
Similarly, for a given finite set S, and given another set A, if , then . To prove this, notice that  by the addition principle.

Applications 

The addition principle can be used to prove Pascal's rule combinatorially. To calculate , one can view it as the number of ways to choose k people from a room containing n children and 1 teacher. Then there are  ways to choose people without choosing the teacher, and  ways to choose people that includes the teacher. Thus .

The addition principle can also be used to prove the multiplication principle.

References

Bibliography

See also 

Combinatorial principle
Rule of product
Inclusion–exclusion principle
Combinatorics
Mathematical principles

fi:Todennäköisyysteoria#Tuloperiaate ja summaperiaate